The Hurricane Valley Journal is a weekly newspaper in Hurricane, Utah. Circulation is approximately 10,000, and the paper is distributed in Hurricane Valley, including Hurricane, La Verkin, Toquerville, Virgin, Rockville, Springdale, Hilldale, Apple Valley and Coral Canyon.

History
The paper was established by Ryan Carter in August 1997, and was purchased by Derral Eves three years later. Eves took the publication from once a month to twice monthly, with more articles, columns and writers. Julia Campbell began writing for the paper in July 1998. Carter had up to that point been writing the entire newspaper, with story contributions from city officials, community leaders and local organizations. Campbell’s first stories for the Journal featured new Hurricane Middle School principal Roy Hoyt (now HHS principal) and Stan Stewart, teacher of the year at HMS. She also covered local parks and recreation and the Washington County Fair.

In March 2004, the Journal underwent a design change. Along with a new logo, the Journal featured more pages, with the majority in color. The paper also added a local sports section and a website, with free classified ads and searchable archives. Copy editor and humor columnist Sharon May, later joined the Journal as a full-time staff writer, from Hurricane High School where she taught English for five years. In October 2004 the Journal became a weekly publication.

References

External links
 

Newspapers published in Utah